The following is a full list of members of the Alberta Order of Excellence (AOE), both past and current, in order of their date of appointment.

2021 

In 2021, 8 appointments were made.
 Joan Donald, Red Deer
 Cyril Kay, Edmonton
 Murray McCann, Calgary
 Barb Olson, Calgary
 Merle Olson, Calgary
 D. Gregory Powell, Calgary
 Cor Van Raay, Lethbridge
 Lena Heavy Shields-Russell, Blood Reserve

2020
Salma Lakhani was inducted to the AOE concurrent with her appointment as lieutenant governor of Alberta.

7 other appointments were made in 2020.

 JudyLynn Archer, Edmonton
 Jim Boucher, Fort McKay
 Charlie Fischer, Calgary
 Frances Harley, Edmonton
 John Mah, Edmonton
 Holger Petersen, Edmonton
 Ed Stelmach, Andrew

2019
In 2019, 8 appointment were made.
 Robert Burrell
 Bonnie DuPont
 Katie Ohe
 Ron Sakamoto
 Beckie Scott
 Malcolm Sissons
 Muriel Stanley Venne
 Frances Wright

2018 
In 2018 eight appointments were made.

 Reg Basken, Edmonton
 Rosella Bjornson, Sherwood Park
 Wayne Chiu, Calgary
 k.d. lang, Calgary
 David Manz, Calgary
 Solomon Rolingher, Edmonton
 Allan Wachowich, Edmonton
 Ralph Young, Edmonton

2017 
In 2017 eight appointments were made.

 Steve Allan, Calgary
 Gary Bowie, Lethbridge
 Anne Fanning, Edmonton
 Marie Gordon, Edmonton
 Steve Hrudey, Canmore
 James Holland, Edmonton
 Vivian Manasc, Edmonton
 David Werklund, Calgary

2016 
In 2016 eight appointments were made.
 Barry Bultz, Calgary
 Linda Hughes, Edmonton
 Sheldon Kennedy, Calgary
 Leroy Little Bear, Lethbridge
 Michael Massey, St. Albert
 Paulette Patterson, Grande Prairie
 Shirley Penner, Calgary
 Bill Yuill, Medicine Hat

2015
 Lois Mitchell
 David Bissett
 Jack Donald
 Janice Eisenhauer
 Dennis Erker
 Fil Fraser
 Stan Grad
 Jacob Masliyah
 Frits Pannekoek

2014

 Sharon Carry, Calgary
 Tony Cashman, Edmonton
 Morris Flewwelling, Red Deer
 Colin Glassco, Calgary
 Julia Hamilton, Calgary
 Willie Littlechild, Maskwacis
 Fred Mannix, Calgary
 Reinhard Muhlenfeld, Edmonton

2013

 Douglas Eaglesham (community service/youth programs, military, politics)
 Roger Gibbins (public service/public policy, advanced education)
 Douglas O. Goss (business, community service)
 George W. Govier  (energy, engineering)
 Jim Marshall (fine arts, culture/heritage)
 Anne McLellan (politics, law, advanced education)
 Catherine Roozen (business, health/community service)
 Bill Wilson (military, community service)

2012

 Robert Hironaka
 Roger Jackson
 Irving Kipnes
 Griffin Lloyd
 Preston Manning
 Ronald Southern
 Robert Westbury
 Rosaleen Zdunich

2011

 Patricia Blocksom
 Martin Cohos
 Bruce Hogle
 Walter Paszkowski
 Eric Rajah
 Aritha van Herk

2010
 Phil Currie – palaeontologist
 Alex Janvier
 Ralph Klein – Former premier
 Janice McTighe
 Louise Miller
 William Mooney
 Reza Nasseri (home builder)
 Robert Steadward

2009
 William (Bill) Bowes
 Harry Hole;
 Shirzad Ahmed
 Brian Felesky, Q.C.
 Michael John Frey

2008
 Clare Drake
 Dr. Helen Hays
 Allan P. Markin
 Dr. David W. Schindler
 Daryl K. (Doc) Seaman
 JR Shaw
 Thomas J. Walsh

2007
 Chief Victor Stanley Buffalo
 Evelyn L. Buckley
 Lt. General Donald C. Laubman
 David W. Leonard
 Gary William (Wilcox) McPherson
 Douglas H. Mitchell
 Patrick R. Nixon

2006
 William (Bill) Cochrane
 Bertha (Berdie) Fowler
 Richard (Dick) Haskayne
 Harry Hole
 James (Jim) Horsman
 Samuel (Sam) Lieberman
 Raymond (Ray) Rajotte
 Matthew Spence
 Ian Tyson

2005
 Robert W. Chapman Sr.
 Dr. Gerald Hankins
 Dr. Margaret (Marmie) Hess
 Elsie Kawulych
 Norman Kwong (as Lieutenant Governor of Alberta)
 Father Charles Michael McCaffrey
 Ronald Mannix

2004
 Alvin Gerald Libin
 M. Ann McCaig
 Eric Patrick Newell
 Bryan Perkins
 John & Barbara Poole

2003
 Donald F. Mazankowski
 Audrey Attril Morrice
 Jim Simpson Palmer
 Leonard Peter Ratzlaff

2002
 Dr. Steven Aung
 James. K. Gray
 John Murrell

2001
 Louis Armand Desrochers
 Colonel (ret.) Donald Stewart Ethell

2000
 Jenny Belzberg
 Dr. Chester R. Cunningham
 Lois Hole (as Lieutenant Governor of Alberta)
 Dr. D. Lorne J. Tyrrell

1999
 Donald R. Getty
 Stanley G. Reynolds
 Dr. Shirley Marie Stinson

1998
 Harley N. Hotchkiss
 June L. Lore
 Sandy A. Mactaggart
 Dr. Donald R. Stanley

1997
 Ian Malcolm Macdonald
 Arthur Ryan Smith

1996
 Bud Olson (as Lieutenant Governor of Alberta)
 Dr. A. Ernest Pallister
 Dr. John Snow

1995
 Dr. Stanley A. Milner
 Dr. Francis G. Winspear

1994
 Dr. Helen I. Huston

1993
 Dr. Thomas B. Banks
 Dr. Robert B. Church

1992
 Dr. Howard V. Gimbel

1991
 Dr. Norbert R. Morgenstern
 Gordon Towers (as Lieutenant Governor of Alberta)

1990
 Dr. Joseph H. Shoctor
 Dr. Raymond Lemieux

1989
 Hon. Peter Lougheed
 Dr. Maxwell W. Ward

1988
 Dr. Arthur T. Jenkyns
 Margaret Southern

1987
 Dr. C. Fred Bentley
 Dr. James H. Gray

1986
 Dr. John C. Callaghan
 Leonard K. Haney
 Herbert T. Hargrave
 Dr. Esther Robins

1985
 Helen Hunley (as Lieutenant Governor of Alberta)
 Dr. David S. R. Leighton
 Dr. G. Richard A. Rice
 Dr. Winnifred M. Stewart

1984
 Dr. Alexander Johnston
 Hon. Ronald Martland

1983
 The Right Honourable C. Joseph Clark
 Dr. Mary Percy Jackson* (died 2000).
 Chester Ronning* (died 1984).

1982
 J. W. Grant MacEwan
 Walter H. Johns

1981
 Frank C. Lynch-Staunton (as Lieutenant Governor of Alberta)
 Hon. Ernest C. Manning

References

 Members of the Alberta Order of Excellence

Provincial and territorial orders of Canada